Podocarpus acutifolius, commonly called needle-leaved tōtara, is a species of conifer in the family Podocarpaceae. It is found only in New Zealand.

Etymology 

Distribution 
This species is found in the South Island from northern Marlborough westward and south to southern Westland. Its natural habitat is lowland and montane forest and scrub.

References 

acutifolius
Flora of New Zealand
Least concern plants
Taxonomy articles created by Polbot